The Cathedral of St. Elizabeth (Slovak: Dóm svätej Alžbety, ; Hungarian: Szent Erzsébet-székesegyház, German: Dom der heiligen Elisabeth), also called Saint Elizabeth Cathedral, is a Gothic cathedral in Košice. It is the largest church in Slovakia and one of the easternmost Gothic cathedrals in Europe.

The record of the existence of Kassa (Slovak: Košice), dating from 1230, is connected with the existence of the rectory church. In the process of the settlement's transformation from a rural community into a town, all its periods of successes and failures have been reflected in Saint Elizabeth Cathedral.

According to historical and archaeological sources, the present-day cathedral was built on the place of an earlier church also consecrated to Saint Elizabeth of Hungary. It was referred to in documents of 1283 and 1290, in which the bishop of Eger Andrew II exempted Košice parish from the dean's sphere of jurisdiction.

Description

It is the main church in the Košice Archdiocese. It is one of Europe's easternmost Gothic cathedrals.

The central nave is 24 m long, and the aisles are 12 m long. Construction of the church influenced builders' activity in surrounding towns such as Prešov, Bardejov, Sabinov, and Rožňava, and it also influenced construction of other churches in Poland and Transylvania.

The Gothic cathedral of Košice consists of a choir with a five-side chavet, five naves, two towers, a level sacristy on the north side, and two chapels and an antechapel on the south side. The cathedral has a unique inside layout, in which the central nave and four aisles are crossed in the middle by one transept of the same height and width as the central nave, which together create a Greek cross.

This big central space rises in the centre of the church, and together with three equal exterior gables with richly decorated portals represent the acme of medieval stonework of art in Central Europe. The complex of the cathedral and adjacent buildings (St Michael Chapel and Urban Tower) were declared as Cultural Heritage Monuments in 1970.

History

Original church
The oldest Košice church probably originated in the middle of the 11th century and was sacred to Saint Michael. It was built in Romanesque style at the same place as the current church. The church is referred to in the oldest written records of the town dated 1230. When German colonists settled in Košice in the 1240s, and Saint Elizabeth became the patron saint of the town, the church was rededicated to her.

After this change the church started to be adjusted in the Gothic style in the middle of the 13th century. The church retained the Romanesque tower, but it also gained a Gothic vault and a side chapel.

This parish church burned down around 1380, but it was rebuilt and kept in service until the construction of the current cathedral. Several Romanesque artifacts such as an Iva statuette, a bronze baptistery and several gravestones remain to this day.

First construction stage: end of 14th century until 1420
The fire which destroyed the Cathedral of St. Elizabeth in 1380 led to the construction of a new church. Wealthy local citizens financed the construction of a cathedral with the support of monarch Sigismund of Luxemburg. He donated a considerable amount of money to the construction. Building of a church was also supported by papal curia. In 1402, Pope Boniface IX issued the indulgence bull. All pilgrims who contributed to Košice's church had their sins forgiven. The exact date of the new church construction is unknown, but it is supposed to be between 1380 (fire of old church) and 1402 when there was a first written record. The first stage of construction works lasted probably until 1420.

During this period the church was built as a five-nave basilica. The new cathedral was built around the original foundation. The south polygonal chevet aisles were built first . This was followed by the south enclosure wall construction, the south portal and the west wall where the first two levels of both towers were composed to floor plan of church.

An advanced construction margin related to Silesian Gothic, which took part in the Franciscan church construction in the north part of town, was working at building of a new church. There is a reference from 1411 about director Mikuláš and about Sigismund's master builder Peter from Budin.

Second construction stage: 1420–1440

New construction masonry in 1420 represented a disastrous innovation in the concept of cathedral architecture. Because of a lack of written reference, the architect is unknown. The aims were uprightness, light materials and spaciousness, and this resulted in the construction of the three-aisle cathedral. In a major change of plan, counter aisles were added to the main nave.

This was situated unconventionally at the middle of the main nave length, and a unique central hall space was created. The statue portal decorations of the main nave and side aisles were inspired by Gothic buildings in Prague and Kraków, and were included in the second construction stage. The influence of Parler's masonry at Saint Vitus Cathedral of Prague from the second half of the 14th century became evident in the King's Oratory and its spiral staircase, as well as a motif of round bannisters of the oratory and a stone gallery over the sacristy.

Then building of the cathedral continued with the north external wall construction, the polygonal chevet of the north aisle (parallels of south apsis) and eight-sided top levels of Sigismund's Tower. At the end of the second construction stage the cathedral was ready for vaulting, and it was necessary to pull down the old church. St Michael's church (today called St Michael's Chapel) was built at the same time as the new church, but it was finished in 1400, and it took over the function of a parish church.

Third construction stage: 1440–1462
After the demolition of the old church of St. Elizabeth, the church was vaulted by stellar vault. The particular symmetric shapes of the vault bays were different from each other, and they were not folded from one bay to the other. The newest part of the construction – sacristy and chapel belong to this third construction stage.

The Sigimund's tower was finished and a new town emblem granted by Ladislaus the Posthumous was sculpted at the fifth floor of tower in 1453. The date 1462, sculpted over the entrance portal to the tower, is the year when work on the tower was finished.

Fourth construction stage: 1462–1490
After finishing the Sigimund's tower, attention turned to the building of the south tower, which was named after the monarch of that time and contributor to the building of tower Matthias Corvinus. This tower was built in a more decorated and vertical style than the north tower of the cathedral, because the construction masonry had changed.

At the same time the south shield and portal were finished and there are many elements that recognize Matthias' generosity. Between 1464 and 1490, Master Stephan Lapicidus or Master Štefan Staimecz from Košice, mentioned in documents, was working on the cathedral construction.

Master Štefan built side aisles of the cathedral that were not included in an origin floor plan. It was financed by rich city-dweller families. The Saint Cross Chapel was built by senator August Cromer in 1475. The Saint Maria chapel was built by Satmary Rod in 1477 and by the end of the same century The Saint Joseph Chapel (which no longer exists) was built at the north side of the cathedral.

An inside feature from this period is a work of Master Stephan – the stone pastophorium, and probably the relief of St. Elizabeth at the sacristy wall as well. At that time the church was furnished by rich Gothic mobiliari, from which not too much was kept until today. The main altar of Saint Elisabeth between 1474 and 1477 from the unknown artist has been preserved.

Final construction stage: 1491–1508
After Matthias Corvinus' death began the contest of the throne in Hungary. At that time Polish-Latvian regent John I Albert attacked Košice city. It was the first time that Košice was shot by cannons. The church was heavily damaged, and Nikolaus Krumpholz from Niš was charged with its reconstruction. Master builder Vaclav from Prague assisted him with the reconstruction. According to the documents from the era at cordon of the west façade the reconstruction was done between 1496 and 1498.

In 1508, the presbytery was completed; this is considered to be the year when the cathedral construction was finished. This fact is documented by the scroll of parchment with the particular year and the name of master builder Krumpholz which was found in the presbytery pillar after the big reconstruction of the church in 1908.

Reformation period
In 1556, Košice was affected by a huge fire which damaged the cathedral as well. The church roof, timbers of the roof and a large part of interior were burnt. All the necessary repairs were done by master builder Stanislaus from Kraków, master builders Johann and Gebriel and stone master Matyas.

After this the church was administered by Protestants. They owned the church until 1604 when it was violently garrisoned by Catholics, along with Eger's chapter house. This incident became one of the main reasons of anti-Habsburg revolt of Stephen Bocskai who assigned the church to Calvinists.

The church was returned to Eger's chapter house in 1671 by Emperor Leopold I's decision. During this time the necessary repairs were done, and a chapter house treasure was placed in the church. During Count Imre Thököly de Késmárk's revolt (1682–85) the church was claimed by Protestants. In 1685, the church was permanently restored to the Catholic community.

Baroque period
In 1706 the church was damaged during the Francis II Rákóczi occupation. The most damaged parts were the west and the south side of the church. During the 18th century several parts of the church were fixed and embellished. 

In the second half of the 18th century the church already had 14 altars (with comparison to the 10 that exist today). Baroque–Rococo helmet with sightseeing view obtained the Sigimund's tower after the fire in 1775.

Fabry's reconstruction in 1858–1863
After several years of religious wars and neglected maintenance it was necessary to update the cathedral at the beginning of the 19th century. There were earthquakes in 1834 and in 1845; the town was flooded, and the flood extended to the cathedral where several parts of the ground pavement were damaged. During the 19th century there was an initiative for the cathedral reconstruction in Neo-Gothic style, which was organised by Bishop Ignác Fábry, and Imre Henszlmann, an artist and monuments innovator in Hungary.

In 1857, the St. Elizabeth Cathedral Alliance was established by the members who were devoted to cathedral repairs which took place from 1856 to 1863 under the control of the Emperor's Royal Central Commission of Preservation and Repair of Architectural Monuments and as well as under the assistance of Henszlmann.

Works were laid out by master builders Károly Gerster and Lajos Frey. Fábry's reconstruction effected change of several portals' statues, clapboards to ceramic roof-tiles, stock of new window panes, repair of the south hall and Romantique interior painting.

On the other hand, very important structural defects of the church which were evident at that time were not removed and repaired. Some of the columns were off center from their central line. Their bases were standing on a colour blade layer which was soaked by ground water. Arch ruptures were covered by mortar or were covered by wood. Such an unprofessional practise led to the destruction and state of disrepair after a big windstorm in 1875.

Major reconstruction in 1877–1896
In 1872, the Hungarian Temporary Monuments Commission was established, with Imre Henszlmann as the commission secretary. A major reconstruction was realized from 1877 to 1896 and was the main priority of the Monuments Commission. It was financed mostly from the state budget of the Hungarian government. Imre Steindl, a professor of Medieval Architecture at Budapest Technical University and the most famous architect of the Hungarian neo-Gothic, was named as the main architect of the reconstruction works.

Based on the ruptures in arches he decided that pillars' allocation in the aisles was the main reason for the state of a disrepair of the cathedral statics. He worked out a completely new purist projection of the cathedral's reconstruction where the three-aisle cathedral was rebuilt to a five-aisle cathedral and added arches in side aisles.

Originally medieval star arches at the main as well as the side aisles were rebuilt to network ones. An old choir was removed and on its place Steindl built expanded replicas with more pillars. The next works involved the exterior – adjusting the external walls and gavels, supporting the columns, the water-chutes and windows' carved works, the portals' decoration and the change of Matthias' tower roof.

The late-Gothic St Joseph's Chapel at the north part of the cathedral was completely removed. A neo-Gothic tower which was crossing the main and the side aisles, flèche was created. Steindl's primary plan was to rebuild all the neo-Gothic additional building and components in the cathedral. But those suggestions were declined by the commission and they requested a cheaper exchange of old stone parts for the new ones. Re-Gothicisation of the towers was not realized due to a lack of funds, reflected in a cheaper construction material. During the exchange of a base system from 1878 to 1882 cheap but low-quality sandstone from the nearby Spiššké Vlachy stone-pit was used. Its quick dilapidated outer surface resulted in removal of pinnacles and gargoyles because they endangered pedestrians. With the next reconstruction after 1882 good quality sandstone from Banská Bystrica was used. The main Master builder of the major reconstruction from 1877 to 1880 was Josepf Weber.

From 1880 to 1896, Friedrich Wilhelm Fröde from Vienna was the main master builder. It was supervised by Austrian architect Friedrich von Schmidt. After that a famous architect, Schmidt's student Imre Steindl, had started to work on the Budapest Parliament (in 1885), and Otto Sztehló was his successor. This architect used a preservative method at the Matthias Tower, in contrast with the previous purist method of his forerunners. The Sigismund Tower, the Matthias tower (except the roof), the inner side of exterior walls, the medieval portals with reliefs, the stone inventory of interior and the whole chapel (just the interior part) were kept from neo-Gothic reconstruction.

In 1896 a newly delivered neo-Gothic interior equipment (altars, statues, pictures) was bought and donated for Košice's Cathedral by Hungarian clergy, Bishop of Kassa and wealthy patron Zsigmond Bubics. In 1906, a cathedral crypt was built under the north side aisle according to the plan of Hungarian architect Frigyes Schulek. This crypt was prepared to contain the relics of Francis II Rákóczi and his companions from the Ottoman Empire.

Major reconstruction 1978 until today
In 1970, the Cathedral of St. Elizabeth was declared a National Cultural Monument. All the profiled architectural features (pinnacles, gargoyles, gadroons) had been either destroyed by the rain water or were unmounted. The stone decoration at the north portal was very much affected by weathering. Cathedral reconstruction started again in September 1978 with detailed architectural documentation. After a short break, works started again in 1984.

In the meantime authorities started with the complex solution of Košice centrum monuments innovation, which was in 1983 declared as the biggest town monuments reservation in Slovakia. One of the factors that contributed to higher care of church was excluding motor-vehicle traffic from the main street in 1984 and tram traffic in 1986.

During the reconstruction it was decided to use a method of a maintaining the stage from the big reconstruction at the end of the 19th century. First the roof of the main and side aisles was repaired where the ceramic coloured enamel tiles were changed, but with the original pattern from the 19th century. The flèche was reconstructed and it was necessary to add 264 pieces of lead decorations.

From 1980 to 1992 the most damaged part of the chapel and sacristy were reconstructed. The works were done by the Polish company Polskie Pracownie Konserwacji Zabytków from Vratislav. It was necessary to construct the new crown gardoons, gargoyles and pinnacles – according to the accessible documents and projects from the town's archival collection. Similarly the staircase towers were done. The gargoyles' reconstruction was done according to original Medieval patterns which are retained in the museums. This reconstruction included the interior repair of a chapel.

In 1992–95 the south façade (cleaning and preservation), including windowpanes was done. The Sigimund's tower was under consistent renovation in 1995–97 when a rococo copper helmit was replaced. Cleaned and gilded plumbing decorations are originals from 1775. In 2008 reconstruction of the Rákóczi crypt was finished and in 2009 reconstruction of the most precious north portal was finished.

Today there is renovation work at the exterior of the north façade of the church and the west portal and interior of the crossed north aisle. The Matthias tower is awaiting reconstruction.

Architecture
The base of the space composition is formed by the central nave with five bays which is divided by the cross aisle with one bay in axis. Apparent substitution of an idea are four subordinate spaces, inset into the ground plan of the building and inserted between the arms of main and cross aisle. In the first decades probably the enclosure walls were built and the main outline of space disposition was finished.

In the next few years the question of portals and arches construction should have been solved. In the original spirit of the architecture the excellent stone sculpture works from 1420 to 1440 enriched construction structure with three big portals. The north, the south, and west portals in Košice have difficult profiles, eventuated in dynamic curves, alternating by horizontal and vertical cornices of relief boards and were decoratively enriched by pinnacles. Those architectural works through profile ceiling and allow new ideas using decorative views and play of light and shadow.

Vaulting
As is seen from the reconstruction of V. Mencl, the conception of the figural vaulting is based on individual parts of split arcades' curves and inter vault parts. Their shapes' difficult play is formed by the scheme of the sun rising with its spikes out of the splitting columns. For each sun an individual pattern of its middle is very important. From its diagonal vectors it creates shapes of the cross, rhombus and the trapezoid.

In the subordinate spaces, which are clutched by the arms of main Greek cross of the main aisle and the side aisle, at connecting walls and the east side, the sun scheme is lost in a tangle of cranked rib networks. Master Štefan built a sacrarium over the anteroom at the south wall and he is adding adoration to the chapel of St Cross to its east side and chapel of Mettercia to the west side. At the north side there is the chapel of St Joseph. In these parts the ribs do not reach the head of the lisena but they gather to the arch construction. The vaulting of the chapels is based on an irregular star net vault.

Windows
Master Ján of Prešov demolished old walls and suggested an atrial type which can be seen mostly at the triple aisle. As from the artistic point of view he used efficiency of the smooth walls and the large windows in order to whiten the interior.

Heraldry at windows of main aisle
From the main altar towards the west gate is decorated by windows of the main altar with heraldries of Košice, Abov's chair and Hunyady chair as well as the heraldry of the countries of the 15th century King Matthias Corvinus: Dalmatia, The Big Bulgaria, Transylvania, Hungary, Serbia, Slavonia, Croatia, Bohemia, Moravia and Silesia.

Interior

Altars

The Main Altar of Saint Elizabeth
This altar was crafted in the period of 1474–77 and is ranked among the most remarkable monuments of Medieval art in Slovakia. The two pairs of both-side decorated wings each containing six Gothic paintings are adjoined to the central part. As a whole, it is a set of 48 paintings in three themed cycles – Elizabethan, the Passion and the Advent. Such construction of an altar is unique even in the European scale.

Altar of the Visitation
The winged altar was crafted to the order of a rich merchant of Košice named Michal Gunthert in 1516. The guiding motif of the altar, located in the arche, is a sculpture of the visit of Mary with Elizabeth. On both sides, the altar has a pair of movable wings. When opened, they represent scenes of the Angelical salutation, the Nativity, the Adoration of the Magi and the Flight into Egypt.

When closed, they depict the sacred personages of Saint Catherine, Saint John the Baptist, Saint Barbara and Saint John the Apostle. The predella is painted with votives of Vir dolorum, Virgin Mary, Saint John the Evangelist, Saint Michael the Archangel and Saint Margaret the Virgin.

The latter were patrons of the Gunthert family. Like the main altar of Saint Elizabeth, the upper part of this altarpiece is late Gothic and decorated with the three groups of sculptures: the legend of three marriages of Saint Anne, statues of the Apostles and of Mary on the top.

Altar of Anthony of Padua
The character of this altarpiece lies in the fact that it is composed of the two late-Gothic altarpieces from the first half of the 16th century, which were saved after a great fire of the city of Košice in 1556.

The paintings on wings are the oldest dated of all altarpiece paintings in the cathedral. They depict 16 saints on the both sides. In 1860, the altar image of Anthony of Padua painted by Ferenc Klimkovics  was placed in the original arch.

Altar of Mettercia
The Neo-gothic altarpiece from the end of the 19th century was manufactured to order of Bishop Zsigmond Bubics, for the purpose of emplacement of new-found late gothic painting of Mettercia. The rare painting of Tyrolean origin from 1516 depicts Saint Anne and the ancestry of Isaiah.

The painting was made for a commission from the family of pharmacist Bartolomej Czottman, and his wife and he are depicted with their coats of arms, among which the coat of arms of Košice is placed in accordance with the latest grant of arms. A mortar, as a symbol of pharmacists is featured beyond the municipal coat of arms.

Altar of Saint Anne
It is one of the series of neo-Gothic altarpieces from 1896 bought for the cathedral on the occasion of the millennial celebration of the Hungarian's arrival to the homeland, as well as of the termination of restoration works. The altarpiece was a gift from incumbent Bishop Zsigmond Bubics.

Altar of Wise Men
Bought in Paris, it was a gift from Bishop Zsigmond Bubics in 1896.

Altar of Saint Joseph
A gift from Konstantin Schuster, the bishop of Vác, in 1896. It was crafted of pieces bought in Brussels by Lajos Lantay, a sculptor from Pöstyén.

Altar of Saint Stephen
A gift from František Pogač, the canon of Košice, in 1896. Crafted by Ferdinand Stufflesser, the Tyrolean carver.

Altar of the Three Martyrs of Košice
The Three Martyrs of Košice were beatified in 1905, Lajos Tihanyi. Crafted the altarpiece dedicated to them in 1923 in Banská Bystrica. Their remains are stored in the predella.

Altar of the Holy Cross
It is historically the newest altarpiece in the cathedral, crafted in Košice in 1931 by Vojtech Buchner in commemoration of victims of the World War I. Two iron panels feature names of all the people who contributed to the construction of the altarpiece.

Not installed altars

Altar of the Last Supper
A triptych altarpiece from the last third of the 15th century is segmented in the deposit of the East Slovak Museum.

Altar of John the Baptist
A neo-Gothic altarpiece crafted for a rare oil tempera painted panel from 1516. It was in the cathedral until 1944. After reconstruction work from 1965 to 1970 the panel was obtained by the East Slovak Museum.

One side of the panel depicts the scene of the Baptism of Christ in Jordan, and the other depicts the torture of John the Baptist. They are of high quality with a notable influence of the Dutch and Flemish renaissance.

Altar of the Death of Mary
An original Gothic altarpiece which was not installed in 1943. Only the predella was preserved, which is lost in the archival store of the cathedral.

The bronze baptistery
The Roman-Gothic baptistery from the 14th century is the oldest monument preserved in the cathedral. It comes from the old church of Saint Elizabeth, the ancestor of today's cathedral. The leg of the baptistery is decorated with triangles, and the chalice is ornamented with zoomorphic reliefs of lions, gryphons and eagles. The upper brim is lined with an illegible Latin inscription. The lid dates back to 1914.

Wall frescoes
In 1892, during the large-scale reconstruction works, a number of original Gothic frescoes was discovered hidden under a layer of plaster since the period of Reformation. Three of them are in the south apse: The Savior on the Day of Judgement in an aureola (sitting Christ holding a sword, Mary and Saint Peter below him), Twelve Apostles and the Resurrection of Christ (with his right hand holding a battalion and blessing with his left hand).

In the northern side apse next to the entry of sacristy another set of genuine Gothic frescoes could be found: the Descent from the Cross, dating back to the 16th century, conceived as winged wall altarpiece. Paintings on the right side are the Flagellation and the Coronation with Crown of thorns, and on the left side Christ nailed at the cross and Christ before Pilate.

Calvary
The sculpture of Calvary dating back to 1420 is one of the oldest articles of the Saint Elizabeth Cathedral's inventory. Its components are: 4.34m tall cross with 3.12m tall nailed Christ in the centre, 2.73m tall statue of Mary on the right side and 2.5-metre-tall statue of John the Evangelist on the left.

Originally, the group of statues was installed in triumphal arch of the nave until 1936, when it was reinstalled in the Royal Oratory. This monumental carved wood piece of art is notable for its deep theatricality of emotional expression of the Christian Period culture.

Four wooden gothic polychromed sculptures
The four wood carvings crafted around 1470, whose authorship is attributed to Jan Weysz, the woodcarver from Presov, correspond to the period style of the main altarpiece of Saint Elizabeth.

The sculptures are 108–112 cm tall and their current installation is secondary, i.e. in the choir's pillars of the western portal. Originally they probably formed a component of an unpreserved upper part of St. Elizabeth's altarpiece. The sculptures represent Saint Stephen, his son Saint Emeric of Hungary, Saint Ladislaus and Stanislaus of Szczepanów, the Polish bishop.

Mater Dolorosa on column
A polychromed wood carving from the period of 1500 112 cm tall. It is installed on a late Gothic twisted column. Above the statue, a Gothic ciborium was inserted into the southern side wall. The expressiveness and the pleating of the gown attest to the high level of late Gothic wood-carving in Košice.

Lantern of Matthias Corvinus
The pinnacle with a niche for lantern built on a stone twisted column dates back to the end of the 15th century. The pinnacles' tympanums are ornamented with the coat of arms of Košice, Kingdom of Hungary, of Czech and Dalmatia.

One unidentified coat of arms is present as well as the one of the Hunyadi family. Originally, the lamp illuminated the area in front of the southern portal towards the neighbouring cemetery. It served its purpose until the early 20th century when it was adapted to gas lighting. It was installed in its current place on the tower wall of Matthias in 1940.

Choir

The pipe organ choir was completely replaced in the period of large-scale reconstruction works in the end of the 19th century. The current replica is a bit longer and has more pillars than the original one. Four polychromed sculptures described above are installed on the pillars and complemented with another four neogothic sculptures of kings of Hungary: Charles I of Hungary, Louis I of Hungary, Sigismund of Luxemburg and Matthias Corvinus.

A new pipe organ was crafted by Angster from Patkostolie. Access to it is through a stairway in the southern tower. The original one was discovered on Košice by a collector, Austrian Count Johann Nepomuk Wilczek who bought it and had it transported to his castle Burg Kreuzenstein near Vienna.

Pastophorium
A stone pastophorium for storing the eucharist, which is located in the northern pillar of triumphal arch, is the most accurate stone masonry work in the cathedral. It was crafted by Master Štefan around 1477. The pastophorium with hexagonal plan is ornated with complex composition of pillars moldings, friezes, arcades and arches.

The twisted niche for storing the eucharist is located on the first floor pastophorium. The metal-tipped door decorated with thumbnails of coat of arms of some lands and noblemen dates back to the 15th century. The tiny plaster sculptures of prophets and kneeling angels replaced former missing parts in the end of the 19th century. Since the Council of Trent, the pastophorium had become redundant and thus the staircase leading to the pastophorium lost its purpose and was removed in 1860.

The relief of Saint Elizabeth
It originated in the same period as the stone pastophorium and the authorship is also attributed to Master Štefan. It is made of three parts which do not fit together because of their compositions. The relief by itself is decorated in abrupt manner in a contrast with hexagonal ciborium with bolt ending with filigree scenes from the Old Testament.

The tip of the ciborium in the shape of the pinnacle is ended with composition of nestled pelican which is the symbol of Christ's blood. In the 19th century the relief was complemented with a Latin inscription S.Elisabeth ora pro nobis positioned above the console.

Rainer Melichar epitaph
The Baroque epitaph of the family of municipal reeve Rainer Melichar is one of the few Neo-gothic relics preserved in the cathedral and dates back to the beginning of the 17th century. The image of Flagellation is between two family coats of arms; above, there is a sculpture of Christ Crucified and above the tympanum, there is a Baroque group of sculptures of two angels on the sides and Christ holding the Earth in the middle.

Aurole of Madonna
Another Baroque relic in the cathedral which appropriately exponentiates the aesthetic interior décor is hanging aureole from the first half of the 18th century, installed under the triumphal arch. The double-sided sculpture of Madonna with child is in the middle of the aureole.

Pews
Some of the cathedral pews are from the 18th century and crafted in Baroque style, other are from the end of the 19th century. Oppositely positioned canonical pews in presbytery were crafted during the period of the large-scale reconstruction works of the cathedral in accordance with the design of the main architect Imre Steindl. He designed the patronal pew of communs with an engraved painted coat of arms of Košice.

Chapel of Mettercia – Annunciation to the Blessed Virgin Mary
One of the two chapels in the cathedral is the Chapel of Annunciation to the blessed Virgin Mary located in the area between Matthias Corvinus' tower and the vestibule of the southern portal. It was built in 1477 by Stefan and allegedly his portrait is on the console of cross-ribbed vaults. The builder holds a paper strip in his hands. The altarpiece of Mettercia is installed in the chapel, hence the other name.

The parents of the Hungarian primate Juraj Szatmary had it built, hence the chapel is also called the Chapel of Szatmary. In the beginning of the 19th century, a crypt of bishops of Košice was established under its floor. Their gravestones are embedded into the enclosure walls. Ignac Fabry, Zsigmond Bubics, Augustin Fischer-Colbrie and Jozef Čársky are buried there.

Chapel of Saint Cross
The second Chapel of the Dome is the Chapel of Saint Cross also built in year 1475. Its donor was the city consul and reeve Augustín Cromer, the reason that the chapel is also called Cromer's chapel. Nowadays it is used as the sacristy.

King's Oratory
To the period of building the old cathedral belongs the construction of the King's Oratory. It was created on the first floor of the polygonal arch of the south annex of transept aisle. On the wall under the oratory is a very significant epigrafic relic from the acting time of John Jiskra of Brandýs in the function of Košice captain.

Twisted staircase
The twisted staircase is from the 15th century and leads to the king's empora. The stairs are divided into two arms of staircase and the west arm heads to the attic of cathedral.

It is constrained and therefore it is assumed it had mainly decorative function. This twisted staircase is the oldest existing one in Europe.

The singer stage
The stone gallery located on the north wall of the main aisle in place of a presbytery belongs to the original accommodation of the cathedral. Its purpose was likely to present different medieval allegories and mysteries during the worship ceremony by actors and singers.

Statue of Saint Florian
Saint Florian was the patron of firemen and protection from fire. The town built his statue in 1748, which first stood near St Michael's Church (later Chapel), later on near the south wall of St Urban Tower, until the year 1940 when it was moved to where it now stands at the entrance hall of the south portal.

Adyton
Building of the adyton belongs to the third part of construction of the Dome, the years 1440–62. In addition there are neo-Gothic statues on the consoles from Jana Marschalek from the end of 19th century. They represent saints. Windowpanes were created by Karl Geyling in Vienna in 1860. On the panes are illustrated coats of arms of minor canons.

The sacrificial altar
The newest element of the cathedral's inventory is the sacrificial altar of the celebrating priest. It is located in the front of the main altar, and is carved from a single piece of sandstone in the shape of two arms creating an ellipse.

The sacrificial altar stands on the tabernacle of the shape of a heart. Near the altar is a new ambon (place for preaching) and the sedeses (chairs). All the three objects were created by Michael and Thomas Baník in 1994.

Pulpit
The stone pulpit with wooden shelter is the masterpiece of sculptors W. Aubram and R. Argenti. On the twisted staircase to it are placed statues of the argurs and the church fathers.

Crypt of Rákóczi
Beside the north wall of the Dome a crypt was built in 1906 for remains of Francis II Rákoczi, Hungarian nobleman and Prince of Transylvania and his family and favored friends. The crypt and the four stone sarcophagi were designed by professor Frigyes Schulek from Budapest.

In one sarcophagus are buried together the prince, his mother (Ilona Zrínyi), and his older son Joseph. South is the sarcophagus of General Count Antal Esterházy, north is where Miklós Sibrik is interred. In the fourth sarcophagus on the other side of crypt Count Miklós Bercsényi and his second wife, Krisztina Csáki are buried.

Apotheosis of life Ferenc II Rákóczi
The monumental mural painting above the north portal of the cathedral is from years 1914–16 and its author is Andor Dudics (or Dudits). It is a triptych.

Exterior

The north portal

The design of the north portal is rare according to medieval tradition in which the north sides of churches did not have portals. Its statues are the most decorative out of the three portals of the cathedral. The reason for this is probably that it faced the busiest part of medieval Košice – to the city market and the city hall. The portal is known as the Golden Gate, because it was gilded in the Middle Ages. The north portal has two entrance doors. Above those is an arch with a relief of The Last Judgement.

The relief is divided into two parts. In the lower one a crowd of people is seen heading to the gates of heaven, where they are welcomed by an angel, and the others who are going to hell are heading to the leviathan's jaws with devils and are in chains. The upper part shows the Last Judgement, the two angels with horns announcing the end of the world. The other figures represent the 12 apostles. Around the relief of the Last Judgement is in three degrees placed five frame reliefs decorated by pinnacles, profilation and traceried motives. Two lower reliefs refer to the life of St Elizabeth. The other three recreate the scene from Calvary.

At the top is Christ crucified on the cross in a shape of tree of life. The other two crucified on Golgotha are shown on the left side as the saved soul carried to heaven by an angel, while on the right side the soul is carried to hell by a devil. Under the scene of Crucifixion on the left side are crying women around Virgin Mary under the cross and on the right side is John the Evangelist surrounded by Roman soldiers. During the great reconstruction of the dome they added niches along the both gates of north portal for neo-Gothic statues of the saints.

The niches are original and it is not known what statues stood on them during the last centuries. The other neo-Gothic statues decorate the portal of the east gavel. The statues are Ugarian kings Charles I of Hungary, his wife Elizabeth of Poland and Louis of Hungary. They are masterpieces of the Budapest sculptor Lajos Lantay.

The West Portal
According to liturgical custom the main entrance to the church is the west portal. Although it has three gates, this entrance has the most simple stone decoration. Two sides are without figure decoration. Above the main gate are two reliefs. One of them directly over the gate shows Christ in Getsemane garden piteously praying to His Father.

To the left of Christ are apostles Peter, John and Jacob, from the right come soldiers led by Judas. In the seddle finish of the portal is the scene of Pieta, Virgin Mary holding Christ body, surrounded by Maria Magdalene and Mary Joseph. The uppermost relief shows angels holding Veronica's towel with Christ's face print.

The whole symbology of portals relates with local tradition of The Holy Blood. At the end of 19th century two Neo-Gothic statues were placed to the main gate of which only one – the statue of John the Baptist has been preserved.

The South Portal
The south portal differs from the previous two portals by the fact that it is placed to the ante-room under the king's empora. It has two gates, the same as the north portal, but without the figures in relief. Instead they are finished by saddles with triangle circling pikes above which is another row of saddles. The portal gives the impression of a triple level entrance to the cathedral.

An interesting component of the portal is aerial bolt of gothic arch of an Ante–room with leaf ornaments. Very interesting is also the baldachin of the statue in the middle of the portal which is formed by flying rooks. The other rook and beast hold devices of the torment. Based on this it is supposed that under the baldachin was previously a statue of Christ.

Today there is statue of Imaculata from the end of the 19th century made by statue maker János Marschalkó. The other statues at the portal are saints, emperor Constantine the Great, Elizabeth of Hungary, Adalbert of Prague, Andrew the Apostle (patron of Košice archdiocese), Francis Xavier and Bishop Teodor.

These statues have nothing to do with the symbolism of the portal; they represent patrons and those who financed the major reconstruction of the cathedral at the end of the 19th century. The middle portrait belongs to architect Imre Steindl. The others included Fridrich Wilhelm Fröde and Otto Sztehló.

The Sigismund's tower

The north tower, which was built in the second period of church construction in 1420–40, was finished in the third period of construction in 1462. This is proved by Košice's arms with the sculpted year 1462 over the portal of the west façade which is also the entrance to the tower. The tower stays at four – square floor plan and has three levels. From the fourth level it narrows to an octagonal floor plan.

A simply decorated tower has between floor cordons decorated by cresting with a geometric motif. Between the fourth and the fifth floor the decoration is complemented by rosette – roses, while each of them is profiled to the different shape. The Sigimund's tower was heavily damaged between 1490 and 1491 when Košice was besieged by John I Albert's army. It was reconstructed by Nicolaus Crompholz from Niš, under the guidance of Vaclav from Prague in 1494–97.

After the fire in 1775 the tower was built up a little bit and on the top of it a Rococo monkshood was mounted, which created the sixth floor of the tower.

The monkshood is covered by a copper sheet with the gold-coated plumber components. On the top of it there is copper cross 3 meters tall. On the first floor there is the mechanism of a large clock, on the second floor there is construction for the bells. On the third floor are two bells from 1926. Alexander Buchner had new bells cast – The God's heard which has 1 530 kg and which holds names of those killed during World War I. There is also a fire brigade room which was used until the 1970s.

The Mathew Tower
The south tower was built in the second period of cathedral construction from 1420 to 1440. It had a fourth – square floor plan. After the construction break the work on building the tower followed in 1462 when the north tower was finished. The works were managed by Master Štefan until 1477.

He constructed it in a more decorated and massive way in comparison with the north tower, although it was not built up to its planned height. It is finished at a level of crown cordon of the main aisle by decorative wreath with heraldries of countries belonging to King Matthias and heraldry of Košice.

The tower is now covered by an octagon metal-sheet roof. The curiosity of the tower is a labyrinth of a circular staircase which are linked to each other. Its importance has not been clarified. The entrance is from the west choir of the cathedral and its staircase also allows access to the pipe organ. The rich decoration of the exterior is complemented by the statues of Matthias Corvinus's supporters which are from Budapest sculptor František Mikula from the 20th century.

The sun dial
On the exterior wall of the south façade above the biggest window of the Mettercie Chapel is situated the horologe type sun dial type from the year 1477.

Flèche
The tower at the crosspoint of the main and the transept aisle is the product of the neo-Gothic remaking while the great reconstruction of the dome at the end of the 19th century. It has a wooden skeleton which is metaled by copper.

The Francis II Rakóczi memorial

In 1906, the remains of Francis II Rákóczi and his band were carried from Turkey to Košice and entombed in the cathedral crypt.

On 24 July 1938, the memorial of the Kuruc Revolt was unveiled. The memorial was designed by Sipos and Vojtech Loffler. Vojtech Buchner moulded it with bronze.

The monarch donations
In the Middle Ages and during modern times Saint Elizabeth Cathedral was the largest church in the Kingdom of Hungary. Its building happened to be a very prestigious issue for the bourgeois, wealthy merchants and craftsmen of Košice.

Legends of the cathedral
Over the years legends of the cathedral were created and maintained. Most of them have their roots in the Middle Ages of building the dome. Construction continuing over the centuries gave birth to the legend of the hollow stone, which the builders put on an unknown place in the cathedral. If the stone was lost, the whole cathedral would fall.

There is also a legend about the gargoyle of the drunk women – it is said that she was the master builder's alcoholic wife. The legend says that because she was tarnishing his reputation by her appearance in the town, he made her a gargoyle forever.

There is a legend about the lantern of King Matthias. The lantern was said to have a power to take away the guilt from every criminal who stood under it.

The last legend is about Christ's blood. During the common Sunday mass the priest spilt the consecrated goblet full of wine on the floor where the image of suffering Christ was created, and some believers heard the Christ moan, they said.

Modern cultural usage
In October 2015, Hungarian rock band Omega, whose members declare Roman Catholicism, performed their Biblically themed Oratórium (Oratory) inside the cathedral. The piece was exhibited since 2013 in Hungary, Romania, Germany, mostly in Calvinist Reformed churches, as well as Moscow's Cathedral of Christ the Saviour. The concert was sold-out and attended by 1,200 spectators, down from the potential capacity of 2,000. Following the concert and laypeople's criticisms of sacrilage, Archbishop Bober had banned future rock concerts in the cathedral allowing only religious, folk or classical music.

Bibliography
 BORODÁČ, Ladislav. Košický dóm. Národná kultúrna pamiatka. Martin: Východoslovenské vydavateľstvo pre Mestskú správu pamiatok v Košiciach, 1975. (slovak)
 Dóm sv. Alžbety v Košiciach. Košice: Sáša pre Arcibiskupstvo Košice a Farnosť sv. Alžbety Košice, 2000;  (in Slovak)
 JUDÁK, Viliam. Pútnik svätovojtešský : kalendár na rok 2011. Příprava vydání Mária Vyskočová a Slavomír Ondica. Trnava: Spolok svätého Vojtecha, ročník 139; . Kapitola Katedrála svätej Alžbety v Košiciach, s. 54–56 (in Slovak)
 LUKAČIN, Alfonz. Staviteľ chrámu. Košice: PressPrint, 1999; . (slovak)
 MARKUŠOVÁ, Kristína. Dóm sv. Alžbety. Sprievodca po košických kostoloch. Košice: Štroffek pre Historickú spoločnosť Imricha Henszlmanna, 1998.  (in Slovak)
 POLÁKOVÁ, Mália. Dóm sv. Alžbety v Košiciach. Národná kultúrna pamiatka. Martin: Obzor pre Východoslovenský krajský výbor Združenia katolíckeho duchovenstva Pacem in terris a Rímskokatolícky farský úrad sv. Alžbety v Košiciach, 1983 (in Slovak)
 WICK, Vojtech. Dóm svätej Alžbety v Košiciach. Košice: Tlačiareň svätej Alžbety, 1936 (in Slovak).

Gallery

See also
 List of cathedrals in Slovakia

References

External links

http://www.cassovia.sk/svalzbeta (in Slovak)
http://www.visitkosice.eu/en/monuments/st-elizabeth-cathedral (in English)
http://www.slovakia.com/sightseeings/st-elisabeth-cathedral/ (in English)

Churches in Košice
Roman Catholic cathedrals in Slovakia
Gothic architecture in Slovakia
14th-century Roman Catholic church buildings in Slovakia
15th-century Roman Catholic church buildings in Slovakia